The 2010 season was the ninth  for the  Team HTC–Columbia Women cycling team, which began as the T-Mobile team in 2003.

Roster

Ages as of 1 January 2010. 

Source

Riders who joined the team for the 2010 season

Riders who left the team during or after the 2009 season

Results

Season victories

Results in major races

Women's World Cup 2010

Judith Arndt finished 5th in the final classification and Adrie Visser 9th. The team finished 2nd in the teams standing.

Grand Tours

UCI World Ranking

The team finished third in the UCI ranking for teams, four points behind Nederland Bloeit.

References

2010 UCI Women's Teams seasons
2010 in American sports
Velocio–SRAM Pro Cycling